Paola Tabet is an Italian anthropologist. She was professor of anthropology at the University of Siena and at the University of Calabria.

Life 

Paola Tabet was born into a family of communist intellectuals, some of whom emigrated to the United States.  She spent her childhood in Manhattan and returned to Italy with her family after World War II. From adolescence she took part in the organization of young communists. However, the Hungarian Revolution of 1956 and a six-month stay in Russia ended her Communist sympathy. This subsequently led her to avoid any political organization.

Trained as a philologist, she initially took an interest in everything including folklore , such as tales, songs and popular writings. She did field research, particularly on kinship in Calabria.  She left the university at the turn of the 1970s, divorced and left for Tunisia. She met a hippie group from the American West Coast whose anti-authoritarian model and collective life outside family and marital stability encouraged her to raise her twin sons, with whom he lived for some years in other hippie communities in Italy. Here she was confronted with more traditional gender relations and homophobia,  which prompted her to work on gender inequalities and to return to university  to study anthropology, influenced by of work by Lévi-Strauss .  She received a scholarship and then a research position at the University of Pisa where she founded a university feminist think tank, and undertook the study of the sexual division of labor and tools. 

Around 1978, she discovered the journal Questions féministes at the École des hautes études en sciences sociales. Here she met Nicole-Claude Mathieu, Christine Delphy, Colette Guillaumin, and Monique Wittig. They became her principal research collaborators. 

In 1979, she wrote her first article entitled La main, les tooles, les armes, where she analyzes the importance of the sexual division of labor, which for her is the foundation of the domination of men over women. She notes that in several of the societies studied, sophisticated weapons and tools are reserved for men, while women have to make do with rudimentary tools or their bare hands, which forces them to work long hours because they are inefficient, monotonous and repetitive. This prevents them, from having free time for political, religious or artistic activities. She argues that "this expropriation of women's time is a fundamental aspect of their exploitation", which persists in today's societies with more difficult access to knowledge or scientific disciplines. 

She also explored the reasons and mechanisms that have allowed this exclusion of women from the technical sphere. She was shocked by the brutality of her findings and was initially hesitant to broach the subject of reproduction. She worked for two years on the limits of women's intellectual work, but then she decided to undertake research on reproduction, which she perceived as a central issue.  This resulted in the publication of the article Fertilité naturelle, reproduction forcée in 1985.

The results of her research on reproduction constituted a starting point for a reflection on the social division between good women (wives, mothers) and stigmatized women (whores, women of pleasure), and on the social construction of women's sexuality. She began her work on what he designates as economic-sexual exchanges.  After the publication of the article Du don au tarif: les relations sexuelles impliquant une compensationnel of 1987, she undertook research on racism, based in particular on Colette Guillaumin's theses on the links between sexism and racism. She researched the responses of 8,000 elementary school children in Italy who were asked to reflect on the hypothesis "What if my parents were black?".  The result of this research led to the publication of the book The Right Skin in 1997.

She worked with Jeanne Favret-Saada, Josée Contreras, Nicole Échard, Gail Pheterson, and The Questions féministes magazine group.

Works

References 

Italian anthropologists

Living people
Year of birth missing (living people)

Italian women anthropologists
Academic staff of the University of Siena
Academic staff of the University of Calabria